"Star" is a song co-written and performed by Canadian rock singer Bryan Adams. It was released in November 1996 as the third single from the album, 18 til I Die (1996). It was the theme song for the 1996 film Jack.

Track listings 
UK limited-edition gatefold CD single

UK CD single

Tracks two, three, and four were recorded live at Wembley in 1996.

Charts

References 

1996 singles
1996 songs
A&M Records singles
Bryan Adams songs
Song recordings produced by Robert John "Mutt" Lange
Songs written by Bryan Adams
Songs written by Michael Kamen
Songs written by Robert John "Mutt" Lange
Songs written for films